Lanre is a Nigerian given name of Yoruba origin that may refer to 
ELDee (born Lanre Dabiri in 1977), Nigerian rapper
Rilwan Lanre Babalola, Nigerian minister
Lanre Buraimoh, Nigerian-born artist 
Lanre Fehintola, British photojournalist 
Lanre Hassan (born 1950), Nigerian film actress 
Lanre Kehinde (born 1994), Nigerian football player
Lanre Oyebanjo (born 1990), British football player
Adeola Lanre Runsewe (born 1989), Nigerian football midfielder 
Lanre Tejuosho (born 1964), Nigerian senator
Lanre Towry-Coker (born 1944), Nigerian architect, politician and socialite 

Yoruba given names